Anton Sergeyevich Kuliatin (born 31 August 1991) is a Russian vision-impaired para-athlete who specializes in middle-distance running. He represented Russian Paralympic Committee athletes at the 2020 Summer Paralympics in the 1500 metres T13 event and won a gold medal.

Kuliatin is married to Alla Antipina, an international long-distance runner. He first trained in football, then changed to athletics, and in 2013 moved to Para athletics, after his vision had strongly deteriorated.

References

External links
 

1991 births
Living people
Paralympic athletes of Russia
Paralympic gold medalists for the Russian Paralympic Committee athletes
Paralympic medalists in athletics (track and field)
Athletes (track and field) at the 2020 Summer Paralympics
Medalists at the 2020 Summer Paralympics
Medalists at the World Para Athletics European Championships
Medalists at the World Para Athletics Championships
People from Biysk
Russian male middle-distance runners
Sportspeople from Altai Krai